Tielt-Winge is a municipality located in the Belgian province of Flemish Brabant. The municipality comprises the towns of Houwaart, Meensel-Kiezegem, Sint-Joris-Winge and Tielt. On 1 January 2006, Tielt-Winge had a total population of 10,009. The total area is 44.16 km² which gives a population density of 227 inhabitants per square kilometre.

References

External links
 

Municipalities of Flemish Brabant